Polopeustis arctiella is a species of snout moth. It is found in northern North America, including Alberta, Manitoba and Nunavut.

The wingspan is about 22 mm.

References

Moths described in 1920
Phycitini